The Marín Dolls Museum-Factory (Fábrica-Museo Muñecas Marín) is located in Chiclana de la Frontera, in the province of Cádiz, Andalusia, southwestern Spain.  The doll museum is located next to the doll factory. The factory was established in 1928, by the artist José Marín Verdugo (1903-1984). By the mid 20th century, the dolls were sold not only in Spain, but also in other European countries. In 1976, the Spanish government granted the Medal of Merit of Labor to the Chiclana José Marín Verdugo factory. Krakow, Poland honored it with the First World Doll Award. It is currently run by Ana Marín, daughter of the founder. The Government of Spain granted to José Marín Verdugo 's Medal of Merit Labor in 1976.

Museum
The museum provides information on the factory building and its traditional Marín dolls, which they won the First Prize Muñequería World. Opened in 1997, the museum's goal is to showcase the various doll types created by the craft factory. It has a large collection of handmade dolls and molds, antique designs and original sculptures. The museum is open weekdays.

Factory
Doll making at the Chiclana factory became a feminized job,  using artisan production methods to create the hand made dolls. The original dolls were dressed in typical Andalusian flamenco attire. Others were produced later to depict  costumes from other regions, such as the chulapa of Madrid and the Valencian fallas.  Since its inception, it has demonstrated traditional doll making techniques, in hair, makeup, and facial expressions. The dolls are easily recognized by their dainty features and smiling faces. The factory has been a reference point for Andalusian economic activity.

References

External links
 Official website

Doll manufacturing companies
Doll museums
Toy companies established in 1928
Museums in Andalusia
Museums established in 1997
Chiclana de la Frontera
Toy companies of Spain
Spanish companies established in 1928